The 1980 Trans America Athletic Conference baseball tournament was held at Luther Williams Field on the campus of Mercer University in Macon, Georgia, from May 1 through 4.  This was the second tournament championship held by the Trans America Athletic Conference, in its second year of existence.  Georgia Southern won their first tournament championship.  The Eagles earned a bid to the 1980 NCAA Division I baseball tournament, the first for the league.

Format
The league again used a blind draw to determine matchups, and conference teams again played few games against each other prior to the tournament.  The teams played a six team, double elimination tournament.

Results

* - Indicates game required 12 innings.

All-Tournament Team
The following players were named to the All-Tournament Team.  No MVP was named until 1985.

References

Tournament
ASUN Conference Baseball Tournament
Trans America Athletic Conference baseball tournament
Trans America Athletic Conference baseball tournament